Harbinger (foaled 12 March 2006) is a retired thoroughbred racehorse best known for winning the King George VI and Queen Elizabeth Stakes in 2010.

Background
Harbinger is a bay horse with a white blaze and white socks on his hind legs. He was sold at yearling auction for 180,000 guineas and entered into the ownership of the Admiral Rous group, one of several syndicates operated by Highclere Throroughbred Racing. Harbinger was trained by Sir Michael Stoute at his Freemason Lodge stable in Newmarket, Suffolk.

Racing career
His first season of racing was as a three-year-old in 2009, where he won two of his five starts including the Gordon Stakes at Goodwood. He returned as a four-year-old with a win in the John Porter Stakes, which was followed by wins in the Ormonde Stakes and Hardwicke Stakes.

Those performances saw him start second favourite in the King George behind his stable companion Workforce, the winner of the 2010 Epsom Derby. Ryan Moore, who had ridden Harbinger in all his previous races, elected to ride Workforce, with the ride on the second favourite being taken by the French jockey Olivier Peslier. However, Harbinger proved to be far too good in the King George, winning by 11 lengths over a field which also included Irish Derby winner Cape Blanco, triple Prix de l'Arc de Triomphe runner-up Youmzain and Hong Kong Vase winner Daryakana. The time was a track record, beating the previous race record set by Grundy in 1975, albeit at the old Ascot track. He was then made a short-priced favourite for the Prix de l'Arc de Triomphe and officially rated the best flat horse in the world. 

Before running in the Prix de l'Arc de Triomphe, Harbinger prepared to run in the International Stakes. Harbinger suffered a leg fracture while on the gallops at Sir Michael Stoute's yard. He was subsequently retired from racing.

Stud record
Harbinger was retired in 2011 to the Shadai Stallion Station in Japan. In the autumn of 2017 he had his first Grade 1 winners when his three-year-old daughters Deirdre and Mozu Katchan won the Shuka Sho and the Queen Elizabeth II Cup respectively before the colt Persian Knight took the Mile Championship. His fourth Grade 1 followed in 2018 when Blast Onepiece won the Arima Kinen. Deirdre gave Harbinger a European Group 1 win in August 2019 when taking the Nassau Stakes. Normcore won the Victoria Mile in 2019 and the Hong Kong Cup in 2020.

Pedigree

Harbinger was inbred 4 × 4 × 5 to Northern Dancer, meaning that this stallion appears twice in the fourth, and once (as the sire of Lyphard) in the fifth generation of his pedigree.

References

External links
Harbinger's stats from Racing Post

2006 racehorse births
Racehorses bred in the United Kingdom
Racehorses trained in the United Kingdom
Thoroughbred family 1-k
King George VI and Queen Elizabeth Stakes winners